The EPS CMD Europhysics Prize is awarded (currently every 2nd year) since 1975 by the Condensed Matter Division of the European Physical Society, in recognition of recent work (completed in the 5 years preceding the attribution of the award) by one or more individuals, for scientific excellence in the area of condensed matter physics. It is one of Europe’s most prestigious prizes in the field of condensed matter physics. Several laureates of the EPS CMD Europhysics Prize also received a Nobel Prize in Physics or Chemistry (Geim, Novoselov, Fert, Grünberg, Kroto, Smalley, Ertl, Bednorz, Müller, Binnig, Rohrer, von Klitzing, Alferov).

Laureates 
Source: European Physical Society
 2020: Jörg Wrachtrup -  Pioneering studies on quantum coherence in solid-state systems and their applications for sensing, and, in particular, for major breakthroughs in the study of the optical and spin properties of nitrogen vacancy centers in diamond.
 2018: Lucio Braicovich and Giacomo Claudio Ghiringhelli - The development and scientific exploration of high-resolution Resonant Inelastic X-ray Scattering (RIXS).
 2016: , Alexei N. Bogdanov, Christian Pfleiderer, Ashvin Vishwanath - Theoretical prediction, experimental discovery and theoretical analysis of a magnetic skyrmion phase in MnSi, a new state of matter.
 2014: Harold Y. Hwang, Jochen Mannhart and  - for the discovery and investigation of electron liquids at oxide interfaces 
 2012: Steven T. Bramwell, Claudio Castelnovo, Santiago Grigera, Roderich Moessner, Shivaji Sondhi and Alan Tennant - Prediction and experimental observation of magnetic monopoles in spin ice
 2010: Hartmut Buhmann, Charles Kane, Eugene J. Mele, Laurens W. Molenkamp and Shoucheng Zhang - Theoretical prediction and the experimental observation of the quantum spin Hall effect and topological insulators
 2008: Andre Geim and Kostya Novoselov - Discovering and isolating a single free-standing atomic layer of carbon (graphene) and elucidating its remarkable electronic properties
 2006: Antoine Georges, Gabriel Kotliar, Dieter Vollhardt - Development and application of the dynamical mean field theory
 2005: David Awschalom, Tomasz Dietl, Hideo Ohno - For their work on ferromagnetic semiconductors and spintronics
 2004: Michel Devoret, Daniel Estève, Johan Mooij, Yasunobu Nakamura - Realisation and demonstration of the quantum bit concept based on superconducting circuits
 2003: Heino Finkelmann, Mark Warner - Discovery of a new class of materials called liquid crystal elastomers
 2002: , Jonathan Friedman, Dante Gatteschi, Roberta Sessoli,  - Development of the field of quantum dynamics of nanomagnets, including the discovery of quantum tunnelling and interference in dynamics of magnetization
 2001: Sumio Iijima, Cees Dekker, Thomas W. Ebbesen, Paul L. McEuen - Discovery of multi- and single-walled carbon nanotubes and pioneering studies of their fundamental mechanical and electronic properties
 2000: Paolo Carra, Gerrit van der Laan, Gisela Schütz - Pioneering work in establishing the field of magnetic x-ray dichroism
 1999: , Michael Reznikov - For developing novel techniques for noise measurements in solids leading to experimental observation of carriers with a fractional charge
 1998: Thomas Maurice Rice - Original contributions to the theory of strongly correlated electron systems
 1997: Albert Fert, Peter Grünberg, Stuart Parkin - Discovery and contribution to the understanding of the giant magneto-resistance effect in transition-metal multilayers and demonstrations of its potential for technological applications
 1996: Richard Friend - Pioneering work on semiconducting organic polymer materials and demonstration of an organic light emitting diode
 1995: Yakir Aharonov, Michael V. Berry - Introduction of fundamental concepts in physics that have profound impact on condensed matter science
 1994: Donald R. Huffman, Wolfgang Krätschmer, Harry Kroto, Richard Smalley - New molecular forms of carbon and their production in the solid state
 1993: Boris L. Altshuler, Arkadii G. Aronov, David E. Khmelnitskii, Anatoly I. Larkin, Boris Spivak - Theoretical work on coherent phenomena in disordered conductors
 1992: Gerhard Ertl, Harald Ibach, J. Peter Toennies - Pioneering studies of surface structures, dynamics and reactions through the development of novel experimental methods
 1991: Klaus Bechgaard, Denis Jérome - Synthesis of a new class of organic metals and the discovery of their superconductivity and novel magnetic properties
 1990: Roberto Car, Michele Parrinello - A novel and powerful method for the ab-initio calculation of molecular dynamics
 1989: Frank Steglich, Hans-Rudolf Ott, Gilbert G. Lonzarich - Pioneering investigations of heavy-fermion metals
 1988: J. Georg Bednorz, K. Alex Müller - Discovery of high-temperature superconductivity
 1987: Igor K. Yanson - Point-contact spectroscopy in metals
 1986:  - Neutron spin echo spectroscopy
 1985: , Michael Pepper - The experimental study of low dimensional physics
 1984: Gerd Binnig, Heinrich Rohrer - Scanning tunnelling microscope
 1983: Isaac F. Silvera - Atomic and solid hydrogen
 1982: Klaus von Klitzing - Experimental demonstration of the quantized Hall resistance
 1981: No award
 1980: O. Krogh Andersen, Andries Rinse Miedema - Original methods for the calculation of the electronic properties of materials
 1979: Eric A. Ash, Jeffrey H. Collins, Yuri V. Gulaev, K.A. Ingebrigtsen, E.G.S. Paige - The physical principles of surface acoustic wave devices
 1978: Zhores Alferov - Heterojunctions
 1977: Walter Eric Spear - Amorphous silicon devices
 1976: Wolfgang Helfrich - Contributions to the physics of liquid crystals
 1975: Victor S. Bagaev, Leonid V. Keldysh, Jaroslav E. Pokrovsky, Michel Voos - The condensation of excitons

See also

 List of physics awards

References 

Awards of the European Physical Society
Condensed matter physics awards